Since 1867 there have been four successive currencies in Romania known as the leu (plural lei). This article details the banknotes denominated in the leu and its subdivision the ban since 1917, with images.

Banknotes of the first leu (ROL)

1877 issue

1909-1916 issue

German occupation WWI issue

1917 issue ("paper coins")
Issued in Iași, during World War I by the Ministry of Finance, as war money. The banknotes represent the ban (pl. bani).

1920 issue

1934–1947 issue
The 5,000, 10,000, 100,000 (1946), 1,000,000, and 5,000,000 lei banknotes from the 1943-1947 series had the left edge wavy.

Red Army 1944 issue

Banknotes of the second leu

Kingdom of Romania

People's Republic of Romania

Banknotes of the third leu (ROL)

1952 issue

1966 issue

1991–1992 issue

1992–1994 issue

1996–2000 issue

1999–2003 issue

A 500 lei coin and the 2,000 lei note shown above were made in order to celebrate the 1999 total solar eclipse. Whereas the 500 lei coin is currently very rare, becoming a prized collector's item, the 2,000 lei note was quite popular, being taken out of circulation in 2004 (a long time after the 1,000 and 5,000 lei bills were replaced by coins).

Banknotes of the fourth leu (RON)
The leu notes issued on 1 July 2005 are of equal size to euro banknotes, so that machines will need less refitting once Romania joins the euro zone. This decision was taken after a lot of debate, and with some opposition, the initial decision being to make them even smaller, similar to the 1966 series. The old leu notes were rather long and fairly uncomfortable to carry.

The design of the notes follows some common guidelines: the obverse shows a flower native to Romania and the portrait of a Romanian cultural personality; the reverse shows a building or a well-known monument. All banknotes are printed on plastic polymer, each in its own colour theme (light green for 1 leu, light purple for 5 lei, light pink and light orange for 10 lei, yellow for 50 lei, blue for 100 lei, dark orange for 200 lei, and light gray for 500 lei). On 14 November 2008 the National Bank of Romania announced the issue of a redesigned 10 lei banknote. The new design employs offset printing in favor of the intaglio printing used in the 2005 series. Also the transparent window will undergo a shape redesign.

Each banknote also features a small transparent window, in the shape of a distinctive item characterising the activity of the pictured personality, a heraldic symbol for Nicolae Iorga, a music key for George Enescu, painting implements for Nicolae Grigorescu, an eagle for flying pioneer Aurel Vlaicu, theater masks for Ion Luca Caragiale, a pen point for Lucian Blaga and an hourglass symbolising poetry and time for Mihai Eminescu. Each banknote has a different texture, to be easily recognised in the pocket or by those with visual impairments.

Note that the 500 lei banknotes see limited usage since they are not dispensed by automated teller machines.

On 21 December 2017, the National Bank of Romania announced that beginning with 1 January 2018, all the banknotes and coins will feature the new version of the coat of arms. All other features (portraits, security etc.) remain unchanged. The banknotes will feature the date of issue 1 January 2018, and will be released as demanded. The 1 July 2005, 1 December 2006, and 1 December 2008 issues will continue to be legal tender and circulate in parallel with the revised banknotes.

On 31 July 2019, the National Bank of Romania announced that it planned to issue the 20 lei banknote, which will feature Ecaterina Teodoroiu, in 2020. In November 2021 the National Bank of Romania announced that the 20 lei banknote bearing Ecaterina Teodoroiu's portrait would be issued on 1 December 2021.

Commemorative banknotes

References

The National Bank of Romania
Issue of the coins and banknotes with the new coat of arms
bancnoteleromanesti.go.ro – All Romanian banknotes from beginning to present.

Banknotes of Romania